Lyddington Bede House (or Lyddington Bedehouse) is a historic house in Rutland, England, owned and opened to the public by English Heritage.
The existing Grade I listed building is a part of a former palace of the Bishops of Lincoln, later used as  an almshouse. It is next to St Andrew's Church in the village of Lyddington. The watch tower or gazebo is separately listed as Grade I and the boundary walls are Grade II. The site is a scheduled monument.

History

The medieval Diocese of Lincoln was the largest bishopric in England, extending from the River Thames to the Humber Estuary. Lyddington lay on a north–south road and the estate here was a convenient place for the bishop's entourage to stop when traversing the diocese.

After the Reformation, ownership passed to the Cecil family who made it their private house. By 1600 it had passed to Thomas Cecil, 1st Earl of Exeter, son of Lord Burghley, who converted it into an almshouse for twelve poor bedesmen and it continued in this use until 1930. A feature is the former bishop's Great Chamber with its beautifully carved ceiling cornice.

The remains of the fishponds of the bishop's palace are nearby.

Nearby English Heritage attractions 
 Rushton Triangular Lodge
 Kirby Hall
 Eleanor Cross, Geddington

See also:  other palaces and residences of the Bishop of Lincoln
?Biggleswade
Buckden Palace, Huntingdonshire
Dorchester on Thames, Oxfordshire
Fingest, Buckinghamshire.
Horncastle, Lincolnshire. Bishop's Palace
Lincoln Medieval Bishop's Palace
London, Camden, Inn of the Bishop of Lincoln, later Southampton House. Purchased from Templars by Bishop Robert de Chesney (1148–68)
?Louth, Lincolnshire
Nettleham, Lincolnshire
Spaldwick, Huntingdonshire, Bury Close
Stow, Lincolnshire
Thame, Oxfordshire
Wooburn, Buckinghamshire. Bishop's Palace

Bibliography
Country Life 24 July 1909, pp. 126–134.
Goodall J. (2017), "Preserved to Perfection: Lyddington Palace, Rutland". Country Life, 1 March, pp. 62–66.
Pevsner N & Williamson, (1984), The Buildings of England: Leicestershire and Rutland, Yale University Press pp 482–3
The Victoria History of the County of Rutland: Volume I, (1908), 118-119
The Victoria History of the County of Rutland: Volume II, (1935), 188-191
Woodfield, C and P, (1993) Lyddington Bede House
Woodfield, C and P, (1982) "The Palace of the Bishops of Lincoln at Lyddington", Transactions of the Leics Archaeological and Historical Society, Vol. 57, 1-16

Lyddington Bishop's Palace and Bedehouse gallery

References

External links 

 Lyddington Bede House - official site at English Heritage

English Heritage sites in Rutland
Country houses in Rutland
Grade I listed buildings in Rutland
Historic house museums in Rutland
Almshouses in Rutland